Idsal is an island in Strand municipality in Rogaland county, Norway.  The  island lies directly between the island of Idse and the mainland with the Idsefjorden and the Høgsfjorden on either side of the island.  There are short bridge on the east and west sides of Idsal that connect it to the mainland and to Idse, respectively.  Most of the island's 12 permanent residents live on the southwestern side of the island, however there are many holiday cottages located all over the island.

See also
List of islands of Norway

References

External links
Idsal Map from  Norgeskart.no

Islands of Rogaland
Strand, Norway